Dwell time (TD) in surveillance radar is the time that an antenna beam spends on a target. The dwell time of a 2D–search radar depends predominantly on
 the antenna's horizontal beam width θAZ, and
 the turn speed n of the antenna (in rotations per minute or rpm, i.e. 360 degrees in 60 seconds = multiplied by a factor of 6).

Dwell time is calculated by:

References

Radar